Raja Azureen binti Almarhum Sultan Azlan Muhibbuddin Shah Al-Maghfur-lah is the eldest daughter of Sultan Azlan Shah of Perak. She was born in Penang, Malaya (now Malaysia) on 9 December 1957.

Biography 
Raja Azureen had her primary education at Marion Convent in Ipoh and her secondary education at the Bukit Nanas Convent School in Kuala Lumpur. She continued her tertiary education and obtained BSc in Mathematics and Economics at the University of Syracuse, New York, in the United States. She continued her studies at the London Graduate School of Business Studies in the UK where she did her Masters in Business Administration. Raja Azureen is married to Mohd. Salleh bin Ismail who is a banker cum business consultant.

In March 2007, Raja Azureen was appointed as the President of Masterskill College of Nursing and Health, Cheras, Malaysia. In July 2008, the college was upgraded to Masterskill University College of Health Sciences (MUCH) and Raja Azureen was proclaimed as the first Chancellor of MUCH.

Raja Azureen is also the President for the Malaysian National Society for the Deaf, Patron for Riding for the Disabled (RDA) Malaysia, Patron for the Friends of the National Library of Malaysia and Patron for the Perak Ladies Club in Selangor and Federal Territory Kuala Lumpur, Malaysia.

She has two sons and two daughters: 
 Abdul Latiff bin Mohd Salleh 
 Azlin binti Mohd Salleh
 Nurlin binti Mohd Salleh
 Abdul Azim bin Mohd Salleh
Nurlin and Syed Haizam had a son and a daughter.

The couple had their first child and only child a daughter named, Sharifah Nur Alara, was born on 9 October 2014. Their second child, a son named Syed Azlan Salahuddin Putra, was born 22 July 2016.

Childhood 
Raja Azureen was born at Penang, Malaya, 9 December 1957 as the second child of the late Sultan Azlan Muhibbuddin Shah ibni Almarhum Sultan Yussuff Izzuddin Shah Ghafarullahu-lah, later Sultan Azlan Shah of Perak, and his wife Tuanku Bainun Binti Mohd Ali (herself a member of the Royal House of Perak and much second granddaughter of her husband's father Sultan Yussuff Izzuddin Shah of Perak)

Her siblings are :
 brother Raja Nazrin Shah (born 27 November 1956)
 brother Raja Ashman Shah (born 28 December 1958 died 30 March 2012)
 sister Raja Eleena (born 3 April 1960)
 sister Raja Yong Sofia (born 24 June 1961)

Honours

Honours of Raja Azureen 
She has been awarded:

Honours of Perak 
  Member Second Class of the Azlan Royal Family Order (DKA II)
  Grand Knight of the Order of Cura Si Manja Kini (the Perak Sword of State, SPCM, 19 April 1988) with title Dato' Seri—current ribbon :

Honours of Mohd Salleh 
He has been awarded:

Honours of Perak 
  Member Second Class of the Azlan Royal Family Order (DKA II)
  Grand Knight of the Order of Cura Si Manja Kini (the Perak Sword of State, SPCM) with title Dato' Seri—current ribbon :

Ancestry

References

Royal House of Perak
1957 births
Living people
Malaysian people of Malay descent
Malaysian Muslims
People from Penang
Daughters of monarchs